A Man About a Dog is a 1947 thriller novel by the British-Australian writer Alec Coppel. Driven to distraction by his wife's repeated affairs, her husband decides to kidnap her latest lover and commit the perfect murder, only to be thwarted by a dog.

Adaptations
In 1949 it was adapted into the British film Obsession directed by Edward Dmytryk and starring Robert Newton, Sally Gray and Naunton Wayne. Coppel himself wrote the screenplay. Coppel also wrote a stage play under the original title A Man About a Dog which ran in the West End for 23 performances at the Princes Theatre in 1949.

References

Bibliography
 Goble, Alan. The Complete Index to Literary Sources in Film. Walter de Gruyter, 1999.
 Keaney, Michael F. British Film Noir Guide. McFarland, 2008.
 Reilly, John M. Twentieth Century Crime & Mystery Writers. Springer, 2015.

1947 British novels
1947 Australian novels
Novels by Alec Coppel
Australian thriller novels
British thriller novels
Novels set in London
Australian novels adapted into films
British novels adapted into films
George G. Harrap and Co. books